Omicron Cephei, Latinized from ο Cephei, is a binary star in the constellation of Cepheus.  It consists of a less massive F-type main sequence star in orbit with a more massive G-type giant star.  The overall apparent visual magnitude of the system is 4.75.

The pair was first determined to be binary by F. G. W. Struve in 1832.  Since then, the secondary has been seen to revolve approximately 45 degrees around the primary.  A number of orbits have been computed, the most recent giving a period of approximately 1500 years.

Visual companion

There is a visual companion, CCDM J23186+6807C, to the binary star.  It has an approximate apparent visual magnitude of 12.8 and is located approximately 45 arcseconds away from it.

References

Cepheus (constellation)
G-type giants
F-type main-sequence stars
Triple stars
Binary stars
Cephei, Omicron
Cephei, 34
219916
115088
BD+67 1514
8872